Drywood Township is a township in Bourbon County, Kansas, United States.  As of the 2000 census, its population was 394.

Geography
According to the USGS, it contains five cemeteries: Howard, Mayfield, Pine Lawn, Pleasant View and Tweedy.

The streams of Cox Creek and Walnut Creek run through this township.

Further reading

References

 USGS Geographic Names Information System (GNIS)

External links
 City-Data.com
 Bourbon County Maps: Current, Historic Collection

Townships in Bourbon County, Kansas
Townships in Kansas